ATS-1 (Applications Technology Satellite 1) was the first experimental geostationary satellite, launched in 1966. Though intended as a communications satellite rather than as a weather satellite, it carried the Spin Scan Cloud Camera developed by Verner E. Suomi and Robert Parent at the University of Wisconsin.
It took one of the first pictures of the Earth's full-disk (the first from a geostationary orbit), on December 11, 1966.
"For the first time," historians would note later, "rapid-imaging of nearly an entire hemisphere was possible.  We could watch, fascinated, as storm systems developed and moved and were captured in a time series of images.  Today such images are an indispensable part of weather analysis and forecasting."  
It was the first satellite to use frequency-division multiple access which accepted multiple independent signals and downlinked them in a single carrier.

The ATS-1 satellite was used during the 1967 international television broadcast Our World, providing a link between the United States and Australia during the program.

The ATS-1 would remain operational for more than 18 years, until April, 1985.

Features
The surface was covered with solar panels, and the whole satellite was stabilized by rotation.

Instruments
A total of fifteen experiments were conducted during the mission:

 Suprathermal Ion Detector
 Biaxial Fluxgate Magnetometer
 Omnidirectional Spectrometer
 Electron Spectrometer
 Particle Telescope
 Solar Cell Radiation Damage
 Thermal Coating Degradation
 Rate Range Beacon 
 Spin-Scan Camera cloudcover 
 Microwave communication transponder 
 Communication VHF transponder 
 Nutation sensor
 Resist-Jet Thruster
 Faraday Rotation
 Meteorological Data Relay System

References 

Spacecraft launched in 1966
Weather satellites of the United States
Communications satellites of the United States
Applications Technology Satellites